Grayson James Allen (born October 8, 1995) is an American professional basketball player for the Milwaukee Bucks of the National Basketball Association (NBA). He played four years of college basketball at Duke University. Allen was drafted with the 21st overall pick in the 2018 NBA draft by the Utah Jazz, where he played for one season before being traded to the Memphis Grizzlies in July 2019. In August 2021, Allen was traded to the Bucks.

He helped Duke win a national championship in 2015, but his reputation was marred by dirty plays. He has often been called one of Duke's best players of the 2010s.

High school career

In 2014, Allen was selected as a McDonald's All-American out of Providence School in Jacksonville, Florida, where he won a state championship the previous year. He won the McDonald's All-American Slam Dunk Contest, jumping over future Duke teammate Jahlil Okafor.

College career

Freshman season (2014–2015) 
During Allen's freshman season at Duke, he averaged 4.4 points per game and was named to the ACC all-academic team. Allen became a major contributor in the NCAA tournament. On April 7, 2015, he helped Duke to victory in the NCAA championship game, scoring 16 points. After the game, commentators cited Allen as one of the main reasons for Duke's win. Coach Mike Krzyzewski agreed, saying, "We were kind of dead in the water. We were nine points down and Grayson just put us on his back."

Sophomore season (2015–2016) 
Allen received national attention following an incident during a game against Louisville Cardinals. On February 8, 2016, Allen was assessed a flagrant-one foul after he tripped Louisville forward Ray Spalding. Commentators said the move appeared to be intentional, as Allen stuck out his leg while on the ground as Spalding was hopping over him.

In Duke's second game against Louisville, Allen exchanged elbows while scuffling for the ball and was later ejected for yelling at a referee after being called for his fifth foul. On February 25, in the closing seconds of a 15-point win against Florida State, Allen tripped opposing guard Xavier Rathan-Mayes. A day later, Allen received a reprimand from the Atlantic Coast Conference (ACC) for his second tripping incident in less than a month.

During the 2015–16 season, Allen was one of the best offensive players in the ACC, averaging 21 points per game and shooting 41% from three-point range. He played an average of 36.6 minutes per game and made 83.7% of his free throws. In the NCAA Tournament, Allen scored 29 points in Duke's 71–64 win over Yale, helping the team to reach the Sweet Sixteen. The team lost its next game to top-seeded Oregon, 82–68; Allen had difficulty scoring near the basket during that game, finishing with 15 points.

Junior season (2016–2017) 
Entering his junior season, Allen was considered one of the top returning players in college basketball. He was named to the Associated Press preseason All-America team and was the ACC media's pick as preseason ACC Player of the Year.

On November 12, 2016, Allen scored 25 points and 10 rebounds in a 96–61 win over Grand Canyon. On November 29, 2016, Allen scored 24 points and 4 assists in a 78–69 win against Michigan State in the ACC-Big Ten Challenge. On December 10, 2016, Allen tallied 34 points in a 94–45 victory over UNLV. On January 28, 2017, Allen scored 19 points in an 85–83 win against Wake Forest. On January 30, 2017, Allen scored 21 points and 5 assists in an 84–74 victory over Notre Dame. On February 4, 2017, Allen scored 21 points in a 72–64 win against Pittsburgh. On February 9, 2017, Allen scored 25 points and 3 assists in an 86–78 win over rival North Carolina.

Prior to the start of the season, Allen stated that he was ready to put the previous season's tripping incidents behind him. However, on December 21, he tripped Elon's Steven Santa Ana and was charged with a technical foul. The next day, Duke coach Mike Krzyzewski suspended Allen from the team indefinitely. After Duke's December 31 game, Krzyzewski stripped Allen of his team captaincy. Allen returned to play on January 4, 2017 after serving a one-game suspension.

During the 2016–2017 season, Allen averaged 14.5 points per game and shot 36.5% from three-point range. He averaged 29.6 minutes per game and shot 81.1% from the free-throw line. Duke reached the second round of the NCAA Tournament, where the team was upset by South Carolina; Allen scored 20 points in the defeat.

Senior season (2017–2018) 

On April 18, 2017, it was announced Allen would return to Duke for his senior season. The team voted to restore him as captain for the 2017–2018 season. On November 14, 2017, Allen scored 37 points in an 88–81 win against Michigan State. On November 29, 2017, Allen scored 21 points in a 91–81 victory over Indiana. On December 2, 2017, Allen scored 25 points and 3 rebounds in a 96–80 win against South Dakota. On December 30, 2017, Allen scored 22 points and 3 rebounds in a 100–93 win over Florida State. For the season, Allen averaged 15.5 points per game on 41.8% shooting.

On March 9, 2018, Allen was assessed a flagrant-one foul in the ACC tournament for tripping North Carolina's Garrison Brooks with what was called a "hip check."

Duke reached the Elite Eight in the NCAA Tournament, where the team was defeated by Kansas, 85–81, in overtime. In his final collegiate game, Allen scored 12 points on 3-for-13 shooting, missed a potential game-winning shot, and missed two three-pointers late in overtime; he did, however, make several clutch free throws. Scott Gleeson of USA Today commented that the season "was a resurgent one for Allen as a whole, in spite of the sour ending. He took on the role of senior captain on a young team full of NBA talent. It was a flipped script from a year ago when Allen was seen as the villain of the sport for his unsportsmanlike behavior..."

Overall career
During his four seasons at Duke, Allen appeared in 142 games and averaged 14.1 points, 3.2 rebounds, and 3.0 assists. He maintained a field-goal percentage of .430, a three-point field-goal percentage of .380, and a free-throw percentage of .834. Allen finished his Duke career with 1,996 points, ranking 12th on the Blue Devils' career scoring list. Allen played in 15 NCAA Tournament games, helping the Blue Devils win the 2015 NCAA National Championship. He earned All-America and Academic All-America honors in 2016, becoming the sixth Blue Devil to receive both honors in the same season. Allen also earned All-ACC Academic honors four times.

Professional career

Utah Jazz (2018–2019)

On June 21, 2018, Allen was selected with the 21st overall pick by the Utah Jazz in the 2018 NBA draft. On July 2, Allen signed a four-year rookie scale contract with the Jazz. He made his NBA debut on October 22, against the Memphis Grizzlies, scoring 7 points in 11 minutes off the bench. On April 10, 2019, Allen scored a career-high 40 points with seven rebounds, four assists, a steal and a block in a 137–143 overtime loss to the Los Angeles Clippers.

Memphis Grizzlies (2019–2021)
On July 6, 2019, Allen was traded, alongside Jae Crowder, Kyle Korver, the draft rights to Darius Bazley and a future first-round pick, to the Memphis Grizzlies in exchange for Mike Conley. On July 11, he was ejected from an NBA Summer League game between the Grizzlies and the Boston Celtics after committing back-to-back flagrant fouls that were described by commentators as "cheap shots". On October 23, he made his debut for the Grizzlies, logging five points, two assists and one rebound in a 101–120 loss to the Miami Heat. On October 29, Allen recorded a season-high two steals in a 91–120 loss to the Los Angeles Lakers. On December 4, he grabbed a season-high seven rebounds in a 99–106 loss to the Chicago Bulls. On August 5, 2020, Allen scored a season-high 20 points and logged a career-high six 3-pointers along with two rebounds and one assist in 26 minutes of action in a 115–124 loss to the Utah Jazz. He matched this point total on August 9, where he also grabbed four rebounds and one assist in a 99–108 loss to the Toronto Raptors.

On December 16, 2020, Memphis announced that they had exercised their team option on Allen for the 2021–22 season. On December 23, he made his season debut for the Grizzlies, logging six points, two rebounds and five assists in a 119–131 loss to the San Antonio Spurs. On March 27, 2021, Allen recorded a career-high four steals in a 110–126 loss to the Utah Jazz. On April 7, he recorded a season-high 30 points, along with four rebounds and three assists, in a 131–113 win over the Atlanta Hawks. On May 5, he suffered an abdominal injury in a 139–135 win over the Minnesota Timberwolves. He missed the Grizzlies' last seven regular season games, but returned in time for the playoffs. On May 29, against his former team the Jazz, Allen recorded a playoff career-high 17 points in 29 minutes. This was his only double-digit scoring performance in the playoffs. The Grizzlies would eventually lose the series in five games.

Milwaukee Bucks (2021–present)
On August 7, 2021, Allen was traded by the Grizzlies to the Milwaukee Bucks for Sam Merrill and two future second-round draft picks. Bucks general manager Jon Horst commented, "Grayson is a talented guard... His three-point shooting, energy, toughness and basketball IQ make him a great addition, and we're excited to welcome him to Milwaukee." On October 18, Allen signed a reported 2-year, $20 million rookie scale extension with the Bucks. The next day, he made his debut for the team, recording 10 points, 6 assists, and 4 rebounds in a win over the Brooklyn Nets.

On January 21, 2022, during a game against the Chicago Bulls, Allen fouled opposing guard Alex Caruso and was ejected from the game after he received a flagrant 2 foul. Bulls coach Billy Donovan publicly condemned Allen after the game, citing Allen's history of dangerous plays and stating that he "could've ended [Caruso's] career." Caruso suffered a fractured right wrist and was ruled out for 6 to 8 weeks. On January 23, Grayson was suspended for one game by the NBA. On the incident, Allen said, "It was unfortunate how it played out. I jumped to block it with my left, and as I'm spinning went to grab the ball with my right hand, not throw him down. It was a really hard fall and I'm glad he's okay. If I could do the play over again knowing he'd fall like that I wouldn't make the play."

On April 22, 2022, during Game 3 of the first round of the playoffs, Allen scored a then-playoff career-high 22 points in a 111–81 win over the Chicago Bulls. Two days later, he bested this total with 27 points alongside three steals in a 119–95 Game 4 win.

On January 4, 2023, Allen scored 16 points, including a game-winning three point shot, during a 104–101 overtime win over the Toronto Raptors.

Personal life 
Allen began dating Morgan Reid while both were students at Duke. Reid was a player on the Duke women's soccer team, and has since turned professional. The couple got engaged in February of 2022 and married on July 23, 2022.

Career statistics

NBA

Regular season

|-
| style="text-align:left;"| 
| style="text-align:left;"| Utah
| 38 || 2 || 11.0 || .376 || .323 || .750 || .6 || .7 || .2 || .2 || 5.6
|-
| style="text-align:left;"| 
| style="text-align:left;"| Memphis
| 38 || 0 || 18.9 || .466 || .404 || .867 || 2.2 || 1.4 || .3 || .1 || 8.7
|-
| style="text-align:left;"| 
| style="text-align:left;"| Memphis
| 50 || 38 || 25.2 || .418 || .391 || .868 || 3.2 || 2.2 || .9 || .2 || 10.6
|-
| style="text-align:left;"| 
| style="text-align:left;"| Milwaukee
| 66 || 61 || 27.3 || .448 || .409 || .865 || 3.4 || 1.5 || .7 || .3 || 11.1
|-
|- class="sortbottom"
| style="text-align:center;" colspan="2"| Career
| 192 || 101 || 21.9 || .433 || .393 || .841 || 2.6 || 1.5 || .6 || .2 || 9.4

Playoffs

|-
| style="text-align:left;"| 2019
| style="text-align:left;"| Utah
| 2 || 0 || 7.0 || .286 || .000 || .714 || .5 || .0 || .0 || .0 || 4.5
|-
| style="text-align:left;"| 2021
| style="text-align:left;"| Memphis
| 5 || 0 || 23.2 || .364 || .381 || .000 || 2.6 || .2 || .4 || .2 || 6.4
|-
| style="text-align:left;"| 2022
| style="text-align:left;"| Milwaukee
| 12 || 5 || 25.4 || .451 || .396 || .636 || 2.9 || 1.3 || .7 || .3 || 8.3
|- class="sortbottom"
| style="text-align:center;" colspan="2"| Career
| 19 || 5 || 22.9 || .418 || .375 || .632 || 2.6 || .8 || .5 || .3 || 7.4

College

|-
| style="text-align:left;"| 2014–15
| style="text-align:left;"| Duke
| 35 || 0 || 9.2 || .425 || .346 || .849 || 1.0 || .4 || .3 || .1 || 4.4
|-
| style="text-align:left;"| 2015–16
| style="text-align:left;"| Duke
| 36 || 35 || 36.6 || .466 || .417 || .837 || 4.6 || 3.5 || 1.3 || .1 || 21.6
|-
| style="text-align:left;"| 2016–17
| style="text-align:left;"| Duke
| 34 || 25 || 29.6 || .395 || .365 || .811 || 3.7 || 3.5 || .8 || .1 || 14.5
|-
| style="text-align:left;"| 2017–18
| style="text-align:left;"| Duke
| 37 || 37 || 35.6 || .418 || .370 || .850 || 3.3 || 4.6 || 1.7 || .1 || 15.5
|- class="sortbottom"
| style="text-align:center;" colspan="2"| Career
| 142 || 97 || 27.9 || .430 || .380 || .834 || 3.2 || 3.0 || 1.0 || .1 || 14.1

References

External links

Duke Blue Devils bio

1995 births
Living people
All-American college men's basketball players
American men's basketball players
Basketball players from Jacksonville, Florida
Duke Blue Devils men's basketball players
McDonald's High School All-Americans
Memphis Grizzlies players
Milwaukee Bucks players
Salt Lake City Stars players
Shooting guards
Utah Jazz draft picks
Utah Jazz players